Nether Exe or Netherexe is a very small village and civil parish in Devon, England.

The Church of St John the Baptist is a small stone church set amidst fields close to the river south-west of the present day village, though there was once a manor house nearby. The church is a Grade I listed building built in the late 15th century. Services are still held in the church, if infrequently.

The hamlet of Netherexe gives its name to the "Netherexe Parishes", a group of 8 Anglican parishes with 11 churches under the pastoral care of a single vicar; though the smallest of them all, Netherexe is almost at the geographical centre of the group.

Richard de Lucy, of Devon, held part of Netherexe, Hayridge Hundred, Devon in 1301.

References

External links

Villages in Devon
Civil parishes in Devon